Communauté d'agglomération Villefranche Beaujolais Saône is the communauté d'agglomération, an intercommunal structure, centred on the town of Villefranche-sur-Saône. It is located in the Rhône and Ain departments, in the Auvergne-Rhône-Alpes region, eastern France. Created in 2014, its seat is in Villefranche-sur-Saône. Its area is 167.7 km2. Its population was 72,815 in 2019, of which 36,291 in Villefranche-sur-Saône proper.

Composition
The communauté d'agglomération consists of the following 18 communes, of which one (Jassans-Riottier) in the Ain department:

Arnas
Blacé
Cogny
Denicé
Gleizé
Jassans-Riottier
Lacenas
Limas
Montmelas-Saint-Sorlin
Le Perréon
Rivolet
Saint-Cyr-le-Chatoux
Saint-Étienne-des-Oullières
Saint-Julien
Salles-Arbuissonnas-en-Beaujolais
Vaux-en-Beaujolais
Villefranche-sur-Saône
Ville-sur-Jarnioux

References

Clisson
Vienne Condrieu
Vienne Condrieu